Thomas the Tank Engine & Friends is a children's television series about the engines and other characters working on the railways of the Island of Sodor, and is based on The Railway Series books written by the Reverend W. Awdry.

This article lists and details episodes from the first series of the show, which was originally broadcast in 1984. This series was initially narrated by Ringo Starr for the United Kingdom audiences, who later re-narrated 25 episodes for the United States. The entire series was narrated by George Carlin for the US audiences.

All episodes from this series can be found on the DVD release Thomas: The Early Years, released by Anchor Bay Entertainment and HIT Entertainment in 2004.

It was produced by Clearwater Features Ltd. for Britt Allcroft (Thomas The Tank Engine) Ltd. and Central Independent Television.

Production
All of the stories in Series 1 were originally written by the Rev. W. Awdry, including a one-off story commissioned by the staff, Thomas' Christmas Party. The seven engines introduced in this series became the core of the cast in later episodes, with crew member (and from Series 8–12, director) Steve Asquith terming them the "Magnificent Seven". Many settings from the first series would stay with the show for years, even through its 2009 transition to CGI, such as Knapford Station, Wellsworth, Gordon's Hill, Henry's Tunnel, and Tidmouth Sheds.

The pilot for the series, which was never aired on television, was filmed in April 1983. It was an adaptation of "Down the Mine", which was remade entirely when the rest of the episodes were shot.

Filming lasted 7 months from September 1983 to March 1984. Post production was completed in April, 6 months before its official debut on October 9, 1984.

Episodes

Characters

Introduced

 Thomas ("Thomas & Gordon")
 Edward  ("Edward & Gordon")
 Henry  ("The Sad Story of Henry")
 Gordon ("Thomas & Gordon")
 James ("Thomas & the Breakdown Train")
 Percy  ("Trouble in the Shed")
 Toby ("Toby & the Stout Gentleman")
 Annie and Clarabel ("Thomas & the Breakdown Train")
 Henrietta ("Toby & the Stout Gentleman")
 Troublesome Trucks ("Edward & Gordon")
 Terence ("Thomas, Terence & the Snow")
 Bertie ("Thomas & Bertie")
 Sir Topham Hatt/The Fat Controller ("The Sad Story of Henry")
 Stephen Hatt ("Toby & the Stout Gentleman")
 Bridget Hatt ("Toby & the Stout Gentleman")
 Mrs. Kyndley ("Thomas' Christmas Party")
 Lady Hatt ("Toby & the Stout Gentleman") (not named; does not speak)

References

1984 British television seasons
1985 British television seasons
Festival Records video albums
Mushroom Records video albums
Warner Records video albums
Thomas & Friends seasons